Renegades is the sixth studio album by the German folk metal band Equilibrium. It is also the first album featuring the band's new clean male vocalist and bassist Martin Berger (Skar Productions) and the new keyboardist Skadi Rosehurst.

It was produced from September 2018 to March 2019.

Music and lyrics 
The album, while maintaining some of their signature epic, folk metal roots, sees the band adopting more electronic and modern elements, including clean vocals. Guitarist, leader and main songwriter René Berthiaume commented:

The lyrics on the album deal with personal themes, in contrast with the German mythology topics that would be addressed before. Also, the album is almost entirely sung in English. According to Berthiaume:

The digipak edition of the album comes with a bonus disc containing 8-bit versions of all the songs.

Track listing

Personnel
Robert "Robse" Dahn – vocals
Martin "Skar" Berger – bass, clean vocals
René "Berthammer" Berthiaume – guitar
Dom R. Crey – guitar
Skadi Rosehurst – keyboards
Tuval "Hati" Refaeli – drums

Technical staff
 Robin Leijon - production, mixing
 Mike Kalajian - mastering

Source:

References

2019 albums
Equilibrium (band) albums
Nuclear Blast albums